Luminox is a high-end watchmaker based in San Rafael, California. Their watches are Swiss made and are notable for containing tritium inserts, providing long-term luminescence.

Luminox history
Luminox Watch Company is a U.S. company founded in 1989 and headquartered in San Rafael, California. Luminox also makes branded watches for various military groups with custom insignias and designs. Among these are the Heliswiss team, the US Bobsled Team, US Coast Guard, US Air Force, and a variety of other special forces and EMS teams worldwide.

The brand has since expanded into over 30 countries. Among the more popular watch models are those designed using visual elements of the fighter jets made by Lockheed Martin. To date, Luminox has designed watches taking cues from the SR-71 Blackbird, the F-117 Nighthawk, the F-16 Fighting Falcon, and the F-22 Raptor.

In 2006, a fifty-percent stake in the Luminox company was purchased by the Swiss brand Mondaine, giving Mondaine increased access to the American market, and Luminox increased access to the European and Asian markets. In 2016, Mondaine Watch Ltd. took over the remaining half of Luminox to become sole owner.

Notable technology
Luminox watches are advertised to possess "always visible technology."  The watch hands and markers contain tritium inserts which provide long-term luminescence, as opposed to phosphorescent markers used in other watches, which must be charged by a light source.

The tritium in a gaseous tritium light source undergoes beta decay, releasing electrons which cause the phosphor layer to fluoresce. During manufacture, a length of borosilicate glass tube which has had the inside surface coated with a phosphor-containing compound is filled with the radioactive tritium. The tube is then fused with a CO2 laser at the desired length. Borosilicate glass is used for its strength and resistance to breakage. In the tube, the tritium gives off a steady stream of electrons due to beta decay. These particles excite the phosphor, causing it to emit a low, steady glow.

Products
Luminox offers four lines of water resistant watches, labeled "Sea", "Air", "Land" and "Space". There are reported cases of counterfeit watches in circulation for the Luminox brand. The fake Luminox watches are reported to be shinier than originals and have wrong font numbers on the dial.

References

External links
Official website

Privately held companies based in California
Manufacturing companies established in 1989
American brands
Watch manufacturing companies of Switzerland
Watch manufacturing companies of the United States
Swiss watch brands